Tocumwal is a town in the southern Riverina region of New South Wales, Australia, in the Berrigan Shire local government area, near the Victorian border. The Newell Highway and Murray Valley Highway join at the Murray River, and form part of the main road route National Highway A39 between Brisbane and Melbourne. The winner of several 'Tidy Town' awards, Tocumwal is affectionately known as 'The Jewel in the Crown That Is The Riverina District'.

The town is said to be named for the local Aboriginal word for "deep hole in the river".

History
Prior to European settlement, the Tocumwal area was inhabited by the Ulupna and Bangerang Aborigines. The first pastoral runs were established in the 1840s. The town was established in the early 1860s and gazetted in 1862 as

"a Village to be called TOCUMWAL ... Situated on the Murray River, on the road from Albury to Deniliquin, about 50 miles west of Corowa, and 40 south-east of Deniliquin."

Tocumwal Post Office opened on 1 August 1868.

Prior to Federation, Tocumwal was an important customs point for goods crossing between the then colonies of Victoria and New South Wales.

A standard gauge branch line from the New South Wales Government Railways Main Southern railway line at Junee reached Narrandera in 1881 and a branch from Narrandera was completed to Tocumwal in 1898. The broad gauge Victorian Railways Melbourne-Shepparton railway line was extended to Tocumwal in 1908, creating a break-of-gauge at Tocumwal until the New South Wales Government Railways line was closed south of Narrandera (about 1980).

During World War II the town was the site of Royal Australian Air Force Station Tocumwal, which was a major Royal Australian Air Force training airfield and aircraft depot. Units included (at various times) the 5 Operational Training Unit, 7 Operational Training Unit, 7 Aircraft Depot and the Paratroop Training Unit. Today, the airfield is a renowned gliding site.

After the war families were housed at the American Air Force Hospital, the men travelled daily over the river to Yarroweyah to work on farms which they could then apply for under the soldier settlement scheme. The hospital was on or next to Barooga Station. Living quarters were made in long Nissen huts, 3–4 in each with a shared bathroom. Single quarters were at the front and a cook was employed for them.

After the war ended, around 200 of the Air Force houses in Tocumwal were disassembled and trucked to Canberra to be rebuilt and reused in new and inner city suburbs where they provided government housing to workers from Melbourne and Sydney to construct the new capital city. Called Tocumwal houses, they remain a distinctive architectural form in Canberra's suburbs, such as O'Connor and Ainslie.

Because of the break-of-gauge between the railways north and south of Tocumwal, this station was a natural choice for military oriented storage facilities and munitions dumps.

Also during World War II, Tocumwal was the location of RAAF No.14 Inland Aircraft Fuel Depot (IAFD), completed in 1942 and closed on 14 June 1944. Usually consisting of 4 tanks, 31 fuel depots were built across Australia for the storage and supply of aircraft fuel for the RAAF and the US Army Air Forces at a total cost of £900,000 ($1,800,000).

Heritage listings 
Tocumwal has a number of heritage-listed sites, including:
 Narrandera-Tocumwal railway: Tocumwal railway station
 Narrandera-Tocumwal railway: Tocumwal Road and Rail Bridge over Murray River

Climate
Tocumwal has a semi-arid climate (BSk).

Facilities
Tocumwal has one state and one Catholic primary school. The nearest high school is in Finley,  to the north.

Australian rules football, cricket and netball are all very popular in the town. Notable sporting teams include the Tocumwal Football Club (The Bloods) who compete in the Picola & District Football League

Tocumwal is in the federal Division of Farrer and the state Electoral district of Murray.

Tocumwal was also where the largest Murray cod in the world was caught.

Tocumwal has a 36-hole championship golf course at the Tocumwal Golf Club, a bowls club and is well known internationally for gliding at SportAviation.

Gallery

References

External links

 Tocumwal : Centre to the Murray Attractions (Official tourism site)
 Tocumwal Railway Station

Towns in Berrigan Shire
Towns in the Riverina
Towns in New South Wales
Populated places on the Murray River
Newell Highway